Thomas Bishopp may refer to:

Sir Thomas Bishopp, 1st Baronet ( 1550–1626) of the Bishopp baronets, MP for Gatton and Steyning
Sir Thomas Bishopp, 3rd Baronet (1627–1652) of the Bishopp baronets

See also
Thomas Bishop (disambiguation)
Bishopp (surname)